Pauw (Dutch for "peacock"), de Pauw or DePauw are variants of a Dutch or Flemish surname and may refer to:

People
Pauw
Adriaan Pauw (1585–1653), Dutch Grand Pensionary of Holland
Jacques Pauw, South African investigative journalist
Michiel Pauw (1590–1640), Mayor of Amsterdam and a director of the Dutch West India Company
Pieter Pauw (1564–1617), Dutch botanist and anatomist
Vera Pauw (born 1963), Dutch football coach and former player

De Pauw / DePauw
Ayrton De Pauw (born 1998), Belgian racing cyclist
Bart De Pauw (born 1968), Belgian television producer, comedian and scriptwriter
Cornelius de Pauw (1739–1799), Dutch scholar at the court of Frederick the Great of Prussia
Gommar DePauw (1918–2005), Belgian traditionalist Catholic priest
Johanna de Paauw (1933–1989), Dutch jazz singer using the pseudonym "Ann Burton"
Josse De Pauw (born 1952), Belgian artist and actor
Henri De Pauw (born 1911), Belgian water polo player
Linda Grant DePauw (born 1940), American modern historian, retired university teacher, non-fiction author, journal editor
Lydia De Pauw (born 1929), Belgian politician
Moreno De Pauw (born 1991), Belgian racing cyclist
Niels De Pauw (born 1996), Belgian footballer
Nill De Pauw (born 1990), Belgian footballer
Noël De Pauw (1942–2015), Belgian racing cyclist
Roger De Pauw (born 1921), Belgian racing cyclist
Tony De Pauw, Belgian businessman
Washington C. DePauw (1822–1887), American industrialist of Indiana

Places
Named for Washington C. DePauw:
Depauw, Indiana, an unincorporated community 
DePauw Avenue Historic District, New Albany, Indiana
DePauw University, Greencastle, Indiana

See also
Pavonia, New Netherland, named for Michiel Pauw

Dutch-language surnames